The SV Odin Hannover is a German rugby union club from Hanover, currently playing in the 2. Rugby-Bundesliga. Apart from rugby, the club also offers other sports like association football, gymnastics and handball.

The club has six German rugby union championship to its name, won in 1914, 1920, 1930, 1931, 1961 and 1963.

History
The club was formed as a rugby union club in 1905. The club was an early power house of German rugby, reaching the second-ever German championship final, but losing to FC 1880 Frankfurt.

It was to be the only championship final the club lost, winning the next six it played in between 1914 and 1963. The club also became the first-ever winner of the German rugby union cup in 1962 and defended this title the following year. The double of championship and cup won that year however was to become its last national titles until 2009. Two more lost cup finals in the late 1960s marking the end of the club's success on national scale.

In recent seasons, after having been relegated from the Rugby-Bundesliga in 1998, the club made a comeback to the national rugby scene when it returned to the 2nd Rugby-Bundesliga, the second tier of German rugby, in 2004. The club remained a mid-table side in the league the following seasons. In 2008, it formed an on-the-field union with VfR Döhren, the two clubs now fielding a combined side in the league, playing as SG SV Odin/VfR Döhren.

In 2009, the combined side managed to win the league cup, a competition not contested by the top teams of German rugby.

The SG SV Odin/VfR Döhren was withdrawn from the 2nd Bundesliga in 2011 and instead entered the tier-three Regionalliga North for the following season. In the 2013–14 season the club made it back to the 2nd Rugby-Bundesliga. In the 2014–15 season the club finished third in the north-east Liga-Pokal group and was knocked out by Neckarsulmer SU in the quarter finals of the play-offs.

In the 2016–2017 season they went unbeaten in the 2. Rugby-Bundesliga and beat RK Berlin Grizzlies to win the first promotion spot to the 1. Rugby-Bundesliga for the 2017–2018 season.

In the 2017–2018 season and after a good start they ended the first leg in the middle of the table. After the winter break they did not manage to win a single game and ended the season in the last place returning to the 2. Rugby-Bundesliga.

Club honours
 German rugby union championship
 Champions: 1914, 1920, 1930, 1931, 1961, 1963
 Runners up: 1910
 German rugby union cup
 Winner: 1962, 1963
 Runners up: 1967, 1968
 German rugby union league cup
 Winner: 2009
 Runners up: 1989

Recent seasons
Recent seasons of the club:

 1 Placing for combined side SG SV Odin/VfR Döhren.
 Until 2001, when the single-division Bundesliga was established, the season was divided in autumn and spring, a Vorrunde and Endrunde, whereby the top teams of the Rugby-Bundesliga would play out the championship while the bottom teams together with the autumn 2nd Bundesliga champion would play for Bundesliga qualification. The remainder of the 2nd Bundesliga teams would play a spring round to determine the relegated clubs. Where two placing's are shown, the first is autumn, the second spring.

References

External links
  Official website
  Official rugby department website
 SV Odin club info at totalrugby.de

German rugby union clubs
Rugby clubs established in 1905
Rugby union in Hanover
1905 establishments in Germany